Highland League may refer to:

 Highland Football League, which operates in the north of Scotland
 Highland Land League which fought for tenants rights
 Highland Alliance League, a small rugby union competition in the north of Scotland